Archer is an American TV drama series that aired on NBC from January 30, 1975, to March 13, 1975. The show was based on the private-eye protagonist featured in a well-respected series of novels by Ross Macdonald.

Due to low ratings, NBC announced it would be cancelling the show after only two episodes had aired.  The show aired from 9pm-10pm Eastern time on Thursday nights.

Premise

Cast
 Brian Keith as Lew Archer
 John P. Ryan as Lt. Barney Brighton

Episodes

Soundtrack
On February 19, 2019, La-La Land Records released a limited edition soundtrack containing the one episode famous film composer Jerry Goldsmith scored (paired with a re-issue of the score to the film Warning Shot, from newly-discovered better elements).

References

External links

Television series by CBS Studios
NBC original programming
1975 American television series debuts
1975 American television series endings
1970s American crime drama television series
Television shows based on American novels
English-language television shows
Television series set in fictional countries
Television shows set in California